Estradiol dibenzoate (EDB), also known as estradiol 3,17β-dibenzoate, is an estrogen ester which was developed in the 1930s and was never marketed. It is the C3 and C17β benzoate diester of estradiol. Estradiol dibenzoate has a longer duration of action than estradiol benzoate (estradiol 3-benzoate) by depot injection.

See also
 List of estrogen esters § Estradiol esters

References

Abandoned drugs
Benzoate esters
Estradiol esters
Phenols
Prodrugs
Synthetic estrogens